St Catherine's School is an independent girls' boarding and day school in the village of Bramley, near Guildford, Surrey, England. The school is divided into a senior school, for ages 11–18, and a preparatory school for girls aged 4–11.

History 
St Catherine's School opened in 1885 with seventeen pupils, most of whom were boarders. Miss Susan Burnett was the founding headmistress. The school was founded during a time when various movements within the Church of England and other Christian denominations were pushing for more freedom for women, especially in matters such as participating in services and in education. St Catherine's was among a handful of schools founded by Church of England bishops. Founder Harold Browne, Bishop of Winchester, was a supporter of the "deaconess movement".

A notable feature of the campus is the chapel, which was completed in 1894 and is known for its Kempe stained glass windows and the 1899 Father Willis organ. In September 2011 the school celebrated 125 years of education for girls and young women and in July 2011 it marked the opening of the 125th Anniversary Halls, a new set of facilities for sports and the arts.

Academics
In the year 2011, 12% of the students were admitted to Oxford or Cambridge.

Scholarships
Academic scholarships are offered for entry at 11+ and for year 11 and/or sixth form, alongside additional awards for excellence in art, sport, and music.

Extracurricular activities
The girls take part in a wide range of sports, including netball, tennis, swimming, and lacrosse. The school has four lacrosse pitches and a number of courts for netball and tennis. In the Preparatory School, hockey is played.

The school hosts a variety of creative arts, with the students regularly taking part in art, textiles, design technology, home economics, drama and music lessons.

Pastoral care

Houses
All pupils, both day girls and boarders, are assigned to one of the six houses. The houses compete in Inter-House competitions throughout the year. Boarders make up around a quarter of its pupils while day girls from Guildford and other towns in Surrey make up around three-quarters of the school. The senior school houses are:
Ashcombe (red)
Merriman (purple)
Midleton (royal blue)
Musgrave (pink)
Russell Baker (light blue)
Stoner (green)
And for the Prep school the houses are:
Pankhurst (red)
Teresa (green)
Curie (yellow)

There are four boarding houses at the school which are Bronte, Symes, Keller and a separate house for the Sixth Form.

Spiritual
As a Church of England school, pupils attend chapel weekly and actively participate in the service. Some pupils sing in the Guildford Cathedral girls' choir. The school began offering organ scholarships in 2006 to encourage more girls to participate in church music.

Patron
The patron of the school since 2015 is Queen Camilla, whose great-great grandfather George Cubitt, 1st Baron Ashcombe, and his wife Laura, Lady Ashcombe were among the founders of the school.

Notable former pupils

 U. A. Fanthorpe – poet
Joan Greenwood - stage, film and television actress
 Isabel Hardman – Political Journalist, Assistant Editor of The Spectator
 Ann Hogarth – puppeteer
 Davina McCall – television presenter
 Dianna Melrose – British Ambassador to Cuba (2008–2012) and High Commissioner to Tanzania (2013–)
 Joan Shenton – broadcaster
 Juliet Stevenson – stage, film and television actress
 Francine Stock – journalist and radio presenter
 Philippa Stroud, Baroness Stroud – Conservative peer
 Barbara Euphan Todd – children's writer
 Dorothy Tutin – stage, film and television actress
 Lily Travers – film actress
 Poppy Drayton – film and television actress
 Lucy Watson – reality tv performer

References

External links 
 St Catherine's School
 Profile – Girls' Schools Association
 Profile on the Independent Schools Council website
 Profile on The Good Schools Guide

Educational institutions established in 1885
Private schools in Surrey
Girls' schools in Surrey
1885 establishments in England
Church of England private schools in the Diocese of Guildford
Member schools of the Girls' Schools Association
Boarding schools in Surrey